The Obed Monastery is a Serbian Orthodox Monastery of  Diocese of Srem. It is located near the villages of Kupinova, municipality of Pecinci, Serbia. The monastery is located within the Obedska Bara nature reserve, the oldest protected area in Serbia as well as the largest flooded area in the country.

References

External Links 

 Манастир Купиново
 Свети Стефан деспот Српски

Serbian Orthodox monasteries in Serbia